Eutelichthys leptochirus is a species of snailfish native to the western Mediterranean Sea where it occurs at depths of from .  This species grows to a length of  SL.  This species is the only known member of its genus.

References

Liparidae
Monotypic fish genera
Fish of the Mediterranean Sea
Fish described in 1959